Kinemastik is a non governmental, non profit organisation responsible for a year-round cultural programme of screenings, talks, exhibitions, concerts and the Kinemastik International Short Film Festival which was started in 2004.
Kinemastik sees itself as an art collective, founded and based in Malta.

Over1 years of its existence, Kinemastik has hosted many filmmakers, musicians, artists and film festival organisers.

Kinemastik has hosted a number of film based workshops, guided by various professionals from all over the world.  
Some of the musicians that played at Kinemastik events were Patti Smith, Bonnie Prince Billy, Owen Pallett, Dark Horses and the Australian/Maltese Christian Anarcho Punks 'Haqqha il-Madonna bukkett fjuri?'.

Kinemastik Film Club holds screenings every Wednesday in Valletta. It was designed as a source for non-mainstream and off-beat movies, a step away from the pervasive and easily available Hollywood mainstream movies.  Kinemastik invites various individuals from all sorts of backgrounds to program a month of films for the Kinemastik Film Club.

Kinemastik collaborates with many film festivals such as Milano Film Festival, Next Film Festival, Cosmic Zoom, Clermond Ferrand Film Fest, London Short Film Festival and many others.

Steph Von Reiswitz and Chris Bianchi from the London-based Le Gun collective oversee Kinemastik's artwork

References

Times of Malta - Kinemastik Short Film Festival

TOM KISFF 2011

KISFF on Malta Today

KISFF on Malta Independent

Ramona Depares Blog

Rich Pickings

British Council

Mediterranea Online

External links
Official website
Dark Horse Music official website
Kinemastik International Short Film Festival
Kinemastik Film Club

Film organizations